Panangangara is a place located at 8.5  km from Malappuram city, on National Highway-213 (old Mangalore-Madras Trunk Road) towards Palakkad. The Malappuram showrooms of both TOYOTA and NISSAN are located at Panangangara.

References 

Suburbs of Malappuram